The Samuel W. Cockrell House is a historic antebellum house in Eutaw, Alabama, United States.  It was placed on the National Register of Historic Places as part of the Antebellum Homes in Eutaw Thematic Resource on December 6, 1982, due to its architectural significance.

References

National Register of Historic Places in Greene County, Alabama
Houses on the National Register of Historic Places in Alabama
Houses in Greene County, Alabama
1859 establishments in Alabama